Archaeometallurgy is the study of the past use and production of metals by humans. It is a sub-discipline of archaeology and archaeological science.

Uses
Archaeometallurgical study has many uses in both the chemical and anthropological fields. Analysis contributes valuable insights into many archaeological questions, from technological choice to social organisation. Any project concerned with the relationship that the human species has had to the metals known to us is an example of archaeometallurgical study.

Methods
There are various methodological approaches to archaeometallurgical studies. The same methods used in analytical chemistry may be used to analyze artifacts. Chemical analysis methods may include the analysis of mass, density or chemical composition. Most methods are non-destructive in nature, such as X-ray spectroscopy, or micro-destructive (requiring removal of only a tiny portion of the sample). Non-destructive methods can be used on more artefacts than destructive ones, but because they operate at the surface of the metal, corrosion and other surface effects may interfere with the results. Options that include sampling include various forms of mass spectrometry and a variety of chemical tests.

Modern to ancient
One of the methods of archaeometallurgy is the study of modern metals and alloys to explain and understand the use of metals in the past. A study conducted by the department of Particle Physics and Astrophysics at Weizmann Institute of Science and the department of Archaeology at the University of Haifia analyzed the chemical composition and the mass of different denominations of Euro coinage. They concluded that even with modern standards and technology, there is a considerable variation within the "same" denomination of coin. This simple conclusion can be used to further analyze discoveries of ancient currency.

Non-ferrous archaeometallurgy
The specific study of the non-ferrous metals used in past. Gold, silver and copper were the first to be used by ancient humans. Gold and copper are both found in their 'native' state in nature, and were thus the first to be exploited as they did not need to be smelted from their ores. They could be hammered into sheets or decorative shapes. The extraction of copper from its ores may have developed due to the attractive colouring and value of ores such as malachite.

Ferrous archaeometallurgy
The specific study of the ferrous compounds (those including iron, Fe) used in the past. Iron metal was first encountered in meteorites, and was later extracted from iron ores to create wrought iron which was never fully molten, and later, cast iron. Iron combined with carbon formed steel, allowing people to develop superior tools and weapons from the Iron Age to the industrial revolution.

History
After initial sporadic work, archaeometallurgy was more widely institutionalised in the 1960s and 70s, with research groups in Britain (The British Museum, the UCL Institute of Archaeology, the Institute for Archeo-Metallurgical Studies (iams)), Germany (Deutsches Bergbau Museum) and the US (MIT and Harvard).
Specialisations within metallurgical focus on metallography of finished objects, mineralogy of waste products such as slag and manufacturing studies.

See also 
 Ancient iron production
 Cupellation
 Liquation
 Roman metallurgy
 Metallurgy during the Copper Age in Europe
 Metallurgy in Pre-Columbian America
 History of ferrous metallurgy
 Native copper
 Tin sources and trade in ancient times
 Experimental Archaeometallurgy
 Nonferrous Archaeometallurgy in the Southern Levant
 Metallurgy#History

References

Further reading
R. F. Tylecote (1992) A History of Metallurgy, 2nd edn, Institute of Materials 
S. Kalyanaraman (2011) "Indian Hieroglyphs", Sarasvati Research Center, Herndon, VA Indian Hieroglyphs
TH. Rehren and E. Pernicka (2008) "Coins, Artefacts and Isotopes- Archaeometallurgy and Archaeometry", UCL Institute of Archaeology.

Bayley, Crossley, and Ponting (2008) "Metals and Metalworking", Historical Metallurgy Society Occasional Publication no. 6, . 
Killick, David, and Thomas Fenn (2012) "Archaeometallurgy: The Study of Preindustrial Mining and Metallurgy", Annual Review of Anthropology, Vol. 41:559-575, DOI: 10.1146/annurev-anthro-092611-145719.

External links
 The Historical Metallurgy Society
 IAMS offered two courses in 2012:
 Prehistoric Metallurgy by Simon Timberlake and Fergus Milton at Butser Ancient Farm.
 Yale University Archaeometallurgy Laboratory